The 2019 USA Indoor Track and Field Championships were held at the Ocean Breeze Athletic Complex in Staten Island, New York. Organized by USA Track and Field (USATF), the three-day competition took place from February 22 to February 24 and serves as the national championships in track and field for the United States.

Schedule

Entry Standards
Events in bold will be contested at the Championships.
Events listed directly below those being contested may be used as alternates for qualifying.
Qualifying window: November 16, 2018 - February 17, 2019
Combined Events Qualifying window: January 5, 2018 - February 17, 2019

Male medalist

Female medalist

Qualification

The 2020 USA Indoor Track and Field Championships serve as the qualification meet for United States representatives in international competitions, including the 2020 IAAF World Indoor Championships. In order to be entered, athletes need to achieve a qualifying standard mark and place in the top 2 in their event and top 12 in the world. The United States team, as managed by USATF, can also bring a qualified back up athlete in case one of the team members is unable to perform.

Additionally, defending 2019 IAAF World Indoor Tour Winner (received a wildcard spot subject to ratification by their country) and World Champions received byes into the 2020 World Championships. The athletes eligible for a bye are:

Defending World Champions
 Courtney Okolo - 400 m
 Will Claye - Triple Jump
 Christian Coleman - 60 m
 Kendra Harrison - 60 m hurdles
 Sandi Morris - Pole Vault

Defending World Tour Winner
 Nathan Strother - 400 m
 Jarret Eaton - 60 m hurdles

References

External links
 2019 USA Indoor Track & Field Championships Results - 2/22/2019 to 2/24/2019 Ocean Breeze Athletic Complex  NewYork.usatf.org
 Complete Results
 2019 USATF Indoor Track and Field Championships Home Page
 Official USATF results - 2019 USA Indoor Track & Field Championships
 2019 and 2020 USATF Indoors to be at Staten Island’s Ocean Breeze Athletic Complex  New York City Parks Press Office April 25, 2018 letsrun.com
 USATF Indoor Championships to Be Held on Staten Island in 2019 and 2020 Published by DyeStat.com Apr 25th, 10:32pm DyeStat
 NYC Parks’ Ocean Breeze Athletic Complex selected to host to 2019, 2020 USATF Indoor Championships USATF

USA Indoor Track and Field Championships
Track and field indoor
USA Indoor Track and Field Championships
USA Indoor Track and Field Championships
USA Indoor Track and Field Championships
History of Staten Island
Sports competitions in New York City
Sports in Staten Island
Track and field in New York City